The Douglas A-4 Skyhawk is an American single-engine carrier-capable lightweight attack aircraft designed for the United States Navy. Still in active service in a few countries, it has been retired by most operators. There are many examples of the Skyhawk preserved around the world, some airworthy and others on display, often in aviation museums and at facilities that once operated this aircraft.

List of preserved aircraft by country

Argentina
 A-4B (A-4P)
 142688: National Aeronautics Museum, Moron, Argentina.
 142748: Brigada Aerea, Villa Reynolds, Argentina.
 142749: Regional Interforce Museum, San Luis, Argentina.
 142752: Aerospace Technical Museum, Córdoba, Argentina.
 142757: Brigada Aerea, Mendoza, Argentina.
 142773: Rio Cuarto Material Area, Las Higueras Airport, Argentina.
 142803: Córdoba, Argentina.
 142855: National Aeronautics Museum, Buenos Aires, Argentina.
 144988: Flying Club, Mar del Plata, Argentina.

 A-4B (A-4Q)
 144882: Espora Naval Aviation Museum, Buenos Aires, Argentina.
 144915: Naval Headquarters, Buenos Aires, Argentina.
 A-4C

 148438: National Museum of Malvinas, Córdoba, Argentina.
 149564: Brigada Aerea Museum, Mendoza, Argentina.
 149514: National Aeronautics Museum, Buenos Aires, Argentina.
 A-4F
 154173: Aerospace Technical Museum, Córdoba, Argentina.
TA-4J
 158477: Museo Santa Romana, San Luis, Argentina.

Australia
 A-4B
 142871: A-4B displayed as A-4G 154906 (885) and from 2007 as A-4G 154903 (882) Fleet Air Arm Museum (Australia), Nowra, New South Wales.
 TA-4G
 154911: displayed as TA-4G (880) Fleet Air Arm Museum (Australia), Nowra, New South Wales.

France 
 A-4SU
 147797 (928): on display at the French Aerospace Museum in Paris.
 145071 (941): stored at the French Aerospace Museum.

Indonesia
 A-4E

 TT-0401: Sengkang town park, Wajo Regency, South Sulawesi
 TT-0402: Komando Operasi Angkatan Udara II, Makassar, South Sulawesi
 TT-0403: Haluoleo Airport park, Kendari, South East Sulawesi
 TT-0408: Suryadarma Air Force Base Museum, Kalijati, Subang, West Java
 TT-0410: Komando Operasi Angkatan Udara II, Makassar, South Sulawesi
 TT-0418: Regent's office of Tulang Bawang Regency, Lampung
 TT-0431: Hospital of Indonesian Air Force, dr. Dody Sarjoto, Makassar, South Sulawesi
 TT-0431: Iswahyudi Air Force Base, Magetan, East Java
 TT-0432: Supadio International Airport, Kubu Raya Regency, West Kalimantan
 TT-0433: Roesmin Nurjadin Air Force Base, Pekanbaru, Riau
 TT-0435: Sultan Iskandar Muda Air Force Base, Aceh Besar Regency, Aceh
 TT-0436: Abdul Rachman Saleh Air Force Base, Malang, East Java
 TT-0437: Majalengka Dirgantara Park, Majalengka Regency, West Java
 TT-0438: Satria Mandala Museum, South Jakarta, Jakarta.
 TT-0440: Dirgantara Mandala Museum, Sleman Regency, Special Region of Yogyakarta
 TT-0441: Sultan Hasanuddin Air Force Base, Makassar, South Sulawesi
 TT-0442: Skadron Udara 11, Sultan Hasanuddin Air Force Base, Makassar, South Sulawesi
 TT-0444: Migas Cepu Edupark, Blora Regency, Central Java
 TA-4H
 TL-0416: Indonesian Air Force Academy, Sleman Regency, Special Region of Yogyakarta
 TA-4J
 TL-0419: Sultan Syarif Kasim II International Airport, Pekanbaru, Riau

Israel
 A-4E
 149964: Israeli Air Force Museum, Hatzerim Airbase, Beersheba, Israel.
 150092: Israeli Air Force Museum, Hatzerim Airbase, Beersheba, Israel.
 151179: Israeli Air Force Museum, Hatzerim Airbase, Beersheba, Israel.
 152050: Israeli Air Force Museum, Hatzerim Airbase, Beersheba, Israel.
 152099: Israeli Air Force Museum, Hatzerim Airbase, Beersheba, Israel.

 A-4F
 155010: Israeli Air Force Museum, Hatzerim Airbase, Beersheba, Israel.
 A-4H
 155254: Israeli Air Force Museum, Hatzerim Airbase, Beersheba, Israel.
 155271: Israeli Air Force Museum, Hatzerim Airbase, Beersheba, Israel.
 155287: Israeli Air Force Museum, Hatzerim Airbase, Beersheba, Israel.
 155289: Israeli Air Force Museum, Hatzerim Airbase, Beersheba, Israel.
 A-4N
 159816: Israeli Air Force Museum, Hatzerim Airbase, Beersheba, Israel.

Japan
 A-4E
 151074: U.S. Naval Air Facility Atsugi, Atsugi, Japan.
 151095: Clinic Syara (ex-Francisco D. Penie Memorial Clinic), Matsushige, Tokushima, Japan.
OA-4M
 154638: U.S. Marine Corps Air Station Iwakuni, Iwakuni, Japan.

Kuwait
TA4-KU
 160210: Kuwaiti Air Force Museum, Kuwait International Airport, Kuwait City, Kuwait.
 160211: Kuwaiti Air Force Museum, Kuwait International Airport, Kuwait City, Kuwait.

New Zealand

 A-4C
 149516: ex-US Navy aircraft that had been upgraded to A-4L configuration and never served in Royal New Zealand Air Force (RNZAF); modified after its delivery to New Zealand to represent an RNZAF A-4K in early configuration; displayed with the spurious serial NZ6207 (the real NZ6207 crashed in 1974), Air Force Museum of New Zealand, Wigram Aerodrome, Christchurch, South Island.

 A-4K
 NZ6201: Classic Flyers Museum, Tauranga Airport, Tauranga, North Island
 NZ6204: Ashburton Aviation Museum, Ashburton Aerodrome, Ashburton, South Island
 NZ6205: Air Force Museum of New Zealand
 NZ6206: Museum of Transport and Technology, Auckland, North Island
 NZ6209: New Zealand Warbirds Association Visitor Centre, Ardmore Aerodrome, Auckland
 NZ6216: Omaka Aviation Heritage Centre, Omaka Aerodrome, Blenheim, South Island

 TA-4K
 NZ6254: Air Force Museum of New Zealand
 NZ6257: A non-flying static example constructed from parts. Currently displayed outside the Officers Mess at RNZAF Ohakea

Singapore 

 A-4S
 142850 (600): Singapore Discovery Centre.
 144979 (690): SAFTI Military Institute.
 145013 (607): Republic of Singapore Air Force Museum.
 TA-4S
 145047 (651): Republic of Singapore Air Force Museum (forward fuselage section and cockpit).
 A-4SU
 145073 (929): gate guardian at Republic of Singapore Air Force Museum.
 TA-4SU
 147742 (900): Republic of Singapore Air Force Museum.

United States

Airworthy

A-4B 
 142112: based at the Warbird Heritage Foundation in Waukegan, Illinois.

A-4C 
 147761: operated by Sky Resources in Anaheim, California.
 147768: operated by Sky Resources in Anaheim, California.
 148581: operated by Sky Resources in Anaheim, California.
 149606: privately owned in Miami, Florida.

TA-4J

A-4K
 154904: operated by Draken International in Lakeland, Florida.
 154905: operated by Draken International in Lakeland, Florida.
 154908: operated by Draken International in Lakeland, Florida.
 155052: operated by Draken International in Lakeland, Florida.
 155063: operated by Draken International in Lakeland, Florida.
 155069: operated by Draken International in Lakeland, Florida.
TA-4K
 157915: operated by Draken International in Lakeland, Florida.

A-4N
 159078: operated by Draken International in Lakeland, Florida.
 159530: operated by Draken International in Lakeland, Florida.
 159542: operated by Draken International in  Lakeland, Florida.
 159545: operated by Draken International in  Lakeland, Florida.
 159805: operated by Draken International in  Lakeland, Florida.
 159815: operated by Draken International in  Lakeland, Florida.

On display

A-4A
 

 137813: National Naval Aviation Museum, NAS Pensacola, Pensacola, Florida.
 137814: United States Naval Museum of Armament and Technology, NCC China Lake (North), Ridgecrest, California.
 137826: Estrella Warbirds Museum, Paso Robles, California.

 139929: USS Hornet Museum, Alameda, California.
 139931: Gate guardian at Naval Air Warfare Center Training Systems Division, Orlando, Florida.   
 139947: MAPS Air Museum, North Canton, Ohio.  Formerly on display at Octave Chanute Aerospace Museum at the former Chanute AFB, Rantoul, Illinois. 
 139953: Hickey Park, Lemoore, California.  
 139956 (displayed as 142176) : Aviation Wing of the Marietta Museum of History, Dobbins ARB (formerly Atlanta NAS), Atlanta, Georgia.  
 139968: U.S. Naval Academy, Annapolis, Maryland.
 142166: George T. Baker Aviation School, Miami, Florida.
 142180: NAS Wildwood Museum, Cape May County Airport, New Jersey. 
 142200: Alameda Point, former NAS Alameda, Alameda, California. 
 142219: New England Air Museum, Windsor Locks, Connecticut.
 142226: Carolinas Aviation Museum, Charlotte Douglas International Airport, Charlotte, North Carolina.
 142227: Western Museum of Flight, Torrance, California.
 142230: Naval Surface Warfare Center, Crane, Indiana.

A-4B
 142094: NAS Lemoore, Lemoore, California. 
 142100: NAS Fallon, Fallon, Nevada. 
 142105: Veterans of Foreign Wars Post 8076, Hartwell, Georgia. 
 142106: Naval Air Engineering Station Lakehurst, Lakehurst, New Jersey. 
 142120: Weapons Survivability Lab, NCC China Lake (North), Ridgecrest, California. 
 142675: USS Lexington Museum of The Bay, Corpus Christi, Texas.
 142678: City of Purdy, Purdy, Missouri. 
 142717: Court House Square, Beeville, Texas. 
 142741: National Vietnam War Museum, Orlando, Florida.
 142761: Selfridge Military Air Museum and Air Park, Selfridge Air National Guard Base, Michigan.
 142777: FAA Facility, Nashua, New Hampshire. 
 142829: HARP, Floyd Bennett Field (former NAS New York), Brooklyn, New York. 
 142833: Aboard former USS Intrepid (CVS-11), Intrepid Sea-Air-Space Museum, New York City.
 142834: Ropkey Armor Museum, Crawfordsville, Indiana. 
 142848: Veterans Memorial Park, Ewing Township, New Jersey. 
 142879: in storage at Flying Leatherneck Aviation Museum at Marine Corps Air Station Miramar, California 
 142905: San Diego Aerospace Museum, San Diego.
 142922: Tillamook Air Museum, Tillamook, Oregon.
 142928: Pima Air & Space Museum adjacent to Davis-Monthan AFB, Tucson, Arizona.
 142929: USS Lexington Museum, Corpus Christi, Texas.
 142940: Shea Field Memorial Grove, former NAS South Weymouth, Weymouth, Massachusetts. 
 144906: Indiana Military Museum, Vincennes, Indiana.
 144930: Proud Bird Restaurant, Aviation Blvd., Los Angeles, California. 
 145011: Air Zoo, Kalamazoo, Michigan.

A-4C

A-4E
 148613: Oriskany Memorial Park, Oriskany, New York. 
 149656: National Naval Aviation Museum, Naval Air Station Pensacola, Pensacola, Florida.
 149977: Veterans of Foreign Wars (VFW) Post 1419, Hamburg, New York. 
 150023: Naval Air Museum Barbers Point (former NAS Barbers Point), Kapolei, Hawaii.
 150058: Nauticus National Maritime Center, Norfolk, Virginia. 
 150076 (marked as Blue Angel #1 154180): National Naval Aviation Museum, NAS Pensacola, Pensacola, Florida.
 151030: Naval Air Museum Barbers Point (former NAS Barbers Point), Kapolei, Hawaii.
 151033: Naval Air Station Key West, Key West, Florida. 
 151036: Veterans Center, Lihue, Hawaii. 
 151038: Yanks Air Museum, Chino, California.
 151064: stored at Planes of Fame in Chino, California.
 151186: Naval Air Station Oceana Air Park, Virginia Beach, Virginia. 
 151194: Pacific Coast Air Museum, Santa Rosa, California.
152012: Albany Municipal Airport, Albany, Oregon.
 152061: Naval Air Museum Barbers Point (former NAS Barbers Point), Kapolei, Hawaii.
 152070: Evergreen Aviation Museum, McMinnville, Oregon.
 152080: National Museum of the Marine Corps, Marine Corps Air Facility Quantico, Triangle, Virginia.

TA-4E
 152102: Naval Museum of Armament & Technology, Covington Municipal Airport, Tennessee.

A-4F
 154180: Museum of Flight, Seattle, Washington.
 154200: Army Airfield Museum, Millville, New Jersey.
 154204: Flying Leatherneck Historical Foundation and Aviation Museum, Marine Corps Air Station Miramar, California.
 154217 (marked as Blue Angel #4): National Naval Aviation Museum, Naval Air Station Pensacola, Pensacola, Florida.
 154977: USS Midway Museum, San Diego, California.
 154983 (marked as Blue Angel #2): National Naval Aviation Museum, Naval Air Station Pensacola, Pensacola, Florida.
 155009: Empire State Aerosciences Museum, Glenville, New York.
 155025: NAS Fallon Air Park, Naval Air Station Fallon, Nevada. 
 155027: Quonset Air Museum, Quonset State Airport (former NAS Quonset Point), North Kingstown, Rhode Island.
 155033 (marked as Blue Angel #3): National Naval Aviation Museum, Naval Air Station Pensacola, Pensacola, Florida.
 155036: Accomack County Airport, Accomack County, Virginia. 
 155049: Patuxent River Naval Air Museum, Naval Air Station Patuxent River, Lexington Park, Maryland.

TA-4F
 154639: Aviation High School, Long Island City, New York.

TA-4J

 152861: Cape Girardeau Municipal Airport, Scott City, Missouri.
 152867: Valiant Air Command Warbird Museum, Space Coast Regional Airport, Titusville, Florida.
 153525: Glenn Martin Aviation Museum, Middle River, Maryland.
 153671: Grissom Air Museum, Grissom Air Reserve Base, Peru, Indiana.
 153678: Air Classics Museum, Sugar Grove, Illinois.
 154291: Historic Aviation Memorial Museum, Tyler, Texas.
 154332: Oakland Aviation Museum, Oakland, California.
 154338: Kingsville NAS, Kingsville, Texas.
 154342: March Field Air Museum, March Air Reserve Base (former March AFB), Riverside, California.
 154649: Palm Springs Air Museum, Palm Springs, California.
 158073: Fort Worth Aviation Museum, Meacham International Airport, Fort Worth, Texas. 
 158087: Naval Air Station Corpus Christi, Corpus Christi, Texas.
 158090: American Legion, Middlebury, Vermont. 
 158094: National Naval Aviation Museum, Naval Air Station Pensacola, Pensacola, Florida.
 158106: Navy Test Pilot School, Naval Air Station Patuxent River, Maryland. 
 158137: USS Hornet Museum, former NAS Alameda, California.
 158467: Flying Leatherneck Historical Foundation and Aviation Museum, Marine Corps Air Station Miramar, California.
 158479: Veterans Memorial Park of Delta County, Gladstone, Michigan.
 158490: Naval Air Station Meridian, Meridian, Mississippi.
 158512: Estrella Warbirds Museum, Paso Robles, California.
 158526: Naval Air Station Meridian, Meridian, Mississippi.
 158716: Combat Air Museum, Forbes Field (former Forbes AFB), Topeka, Kansas.
 158722: Lexington Museum, Corpus Christi, Texas.
 159798: Naval Air Facility El Centro, El Centro, California.

A-4M

 158148: Quonset Air Museum, Quonset State Airport (former NAS Quonset Point), North Kingstown, Rhode Island.
 158182: Wings of Freedom Aviation Museum, Horsham, Pennsylvania.
 158195: Museum of Flying, Los Angeles, California.
 158430: Sequatchie County Veterans Memorial Park, Dunlap, Tennessee.
 159789: Naval Air Station Joint Reserve Base Fort Worth, Ft. Worth, Texas.
 160024: City of Havelock Visitor Center, Havelock, North Carolina.
 160031: 12 Civic Center Plaza, Santa Ana, California.
 160036: Prairie Aviation Museum, Bloomington, Illinois.
 160255: Grenada High School, Grenada, Mississippi.
 160264: Flying Leatherneck Historical Foundation and Aviation Museum, Marine Corps Air Station Miramar, California.

Under Restoration or in Storage

A-4C
 145076: stored for restoration to airworthiness by private owner in Houston, Texas.
 147669: stored for restoration to airworthiness by private owner in Delanson, New York.
 147690: stored for restoration to airworthiness by Sky Resources in Anaheim, California.
 147836: stored for restoration to airworthiness by Sky Resources in Anaheim, California.
 148446: stored for restoration to airworthiness by Sky Resources in Anaheim, California.
 148597: stored for restoration to airworthiness by private owner in Miami, Florida.
 148602: stored for restoration to airworthiness by private owner in Bellevue, Washington.
 149500: stored for restoration to airworthiness by Sky Resources in Anaheim, California.
 149502: stored for restoration to airworthiness by private owner in Dallas, Texas.
 149540: stored for restoration to airworthiness by private owner in Bellevue, Washington.
 149591: stored for restoration to airworthiness by Sky Resources in Anaheim, California.
 149620: stored for restoration to airworthiness by private owner in Idaho Falls, Idaho.

A-4F
 155051: stored for restoration to airworthiness by private owner in Bellevue, Washington.

TA-4F
 153469: stored for restoration to airworthiness by private owner in Bellevue, Washington.
 153484: stored for restoration to airworthiness by private owner in Bellevue, Washington.

See also 
 List of Douglas A-4 Skyhawk operators

Footnotes

References

Notes

External links 

 RNZAF Museum Skyhawk page
 Serial number history of Australian A-4 Skyhawks, prefix N13
 A-4 at Combat Air Museum
 AeroWeb.org A-4 Skyhawks on display

Lists of surviving military aircraft
Douglas A-4 Skyhawk